Laval United FC is an Emirati football club based in Dubai, United Arab Emirates. The club was founded in June 2020 to join the UAE Second Division League to compete with other academies and clubs.

History
The club was originally founded as Al Sahel and had established operations at Ajman, however due to unknown circumstances, the club quickly changed to Laval United and moved their operations to Dubai instead.

Current squad
As of 2021–22 season: 
.

Reference

External links
Laval United FC at Global Sports Archive

Football clubs in Dubai
Laval
Association football clubs established in 2020
2020 establishments in the United Arab Emirates